Moldova, officially the Republic of Moldova, competed at the 2016 Summer Olympics in Rio de Janeiro, Brazil, from 5 to 21 August 2016. This was the nation's sixth consecutive appearance at the Summer Olympics in the post-Soviet era.

The National Olympic Committee of the Republic of Moldova fielded a squad of 23 athletes, 14 men and 9 women, across nine different sports at the Games. Although its full roster was larger by a single athlete than in London four years earlier, this was still one of Moldova's smallest delegations sent to the Olympics. Among the sports represented by the nation's athletes, Moldova made its Olympic debut in taekwondo and tennis, as well as a return to sprint canoeing after two decades.

Of the 23 participants, fifteen of them made their Olympic debut in Rio de Janeiro, including flatwater canoeist Oleg Tarnovschi and his younger brother Serghei, who earned Moldova's first ever gold medal at the Youth Olympics in Nanjing two years earlier.  The remaining eight athletes on the Moldovan squad had past Olympic experience, highlighted by hammer thrower Serghei Marghiev and his older sisters Zalina Marghieva and Marina Nichișenco, shot putter Ivan Emilianov, who qualified for his fourth Games as the oldest and most experienced competitor (aged 39), taekwondo fighter Aaron Cook, who transferred his allegiance from Great Britain after controversially failing to make the London Games in 2012, and freestyle wrestler Nicolae Ceban, who reprised his role of leading the Moldovan team for the second time as the flag bearer in the opening ceremony.

Moldova originally left Rio de Janeiro with only a bronze medal won by the younger Tarnovschi in the men's C-1 1000 metres. On 19 August 2016, both the International Olympic Committee and International Canoe Federation (ICF) stripped him of his medal for breaching the anti-doping rules, handing it over to the next highest-ranked canoeist Ilia Shtokalov of Russia.

Archery 

One Moldovan archer has qualified for the women's individual recurve at the Olympics by virtue of a top six national finish at the 2016 Archery World Cup meet in Antalya, Turkey.

Athletics 
 
Moldovan athletes have so far achieved qualifying standards in the following athletics events (up to a maximum of 3 athletes in each event):

Track & road events

Field events
Men

Women

Canoeing

Sprint
Moldova has qualified a single boat in men's C-1 1000 m for the Games through the 2015 ICF Canoe Sprint World Championships. Meanwhile, the men's C-2 1000 m crew added their boat to the Moldovan team for the Games, as the International Canoe Federation had decided to revoke its license from Romania due to the canoeists' doping violations at the European Championships.

Qualification Legend: FA = Qualify to final (medal); FB = Qualify to final B (non-medal)

Judo 

Moldova has qualified one judoka for the men's half-middleweight category (81 kg) at the Games. Valeriu Duminică earned a continental quota spot from the European region, as Moldova's top-ranked judoka outside of direct qualifying position in the IJF World Ranking List of 30 May 2016.

Swimming 

Moldova has received a Universality invitation from FINA to send two swimmers (one male and one female) to the Olympics.

Taekwondo 
 
Moldova entered one athlete into the taekwondo competition for the first time at the Olympics. Aaron Cook, who previously competed for Team GB at the 2008 Beijing Olympics, qualified automatically for the men's welterweight category (80 kg) by finishing in the top 6 WTF Olympic rankings.

Tennis

Moldova has entered one tennis player for the first time into the Olympic tournament. Due to the withdrawal of several tennis players from the Games, Radu Albot (world no. 113) received a spare ITF Olympic place to compete in the men's singles as the next highest-ranked eligible player, not yet qualified, in the ATP World Rankings as of 6 June 2016.

Weightlifting

Moldovan weightlifters have qualified four men's quota places for the Rio Olympics through the 2014 and 2015 IWF World Championships. The team must allocate these places to individual athletes by 20 June 2016.

On 22 June 2016, the International Weightlifting Federation had decided to strip of two Olympic men's entry places from Moldova because of "multiple positive cases" of doping throughout the qualifying period.

Meanwhile, an unused women's Olympic spot was awarded to the Moldovan team by IWF, as a result of Russia's complete ban from the Games due to the "multiple positive cases" of doping.

Wrestling 

Moldova has qualified two wrestlers for each of the following weight classes into the Olympic competition, as a result of their wrestle-off triumphs at the initial meet of the World Qualification Tournament in Ulaanbaatar.

On 11 May 2016, United World Wrestling awarded an additional Olympic license to Moldova in women's freestyle 58 kg, as a response to the doping violations on the Ukrainian wrestler at the European Qualification Tournament.

Men's freestyle

Women's freestyle

References

External links 

 
 

Olympics
2016
Nations at the 2016 Summer Olympics